María Teresa Monasterio (born October 15, 1969 in Santa Cruz de la Sierra) is a Bolivian weightlifter. At age forty-three, Monasterio made her official debut for the 2008 Summer Olympics in Beijing, where she competed in the women's middleweight category (63 kg). Monasterio placed seventeenth in this event, as she successfully lifted 63 kg in the single-motion snatch, and hoisted 78 kg in the two-part, shoulder-to-overhead clean and jerk, for a total of 141 kg.

References

External links
NBC Olympics Profile

Bolivian female weightlifters
1969 births
Living people
Olympic weightlifters of Bolivia
Weightlifters at the 2008 Summer Olympics
Sportspeople from Santa Cruz de la Sierra
20th-century Bolivian women
21st-century Bolivian women